Samsun was one of the four s purchased by the Ottoman Empire from France in 1907. The ship served in the Ottoman navy during the Italo-Turkish War, the Balkan Wars and World War I.

During the Italo-Turkish war, she did not take part in any active engagement with the Italians like the rest of the Ottoman fleet. In October 1914, she participated in the Black Sea Raid that led to the Ottoman Empire's entry into World War I. Throughout the war, she took part in many missions such as patrol and convoy escort against Allied submarines entering the Marmara Sea, escorting battleships in the main fleet, and minesweeping at the entrance of the Bosphorus. In 1918, she inspected the interned Russian Navy. The destroyer, which served in the navy during the Republican period, was decommissioned in 1932 and dismantled in 1949.

Design
Her hull was made of steel. Her crew, which consisted of 7 officers and 60 sailors when she was built in 1907, consisted of 74 Turks and 17 Germans by 1915 during World War I.

The ship was powered by two vertical triple-expansion steam engines, fed by steam from two water-tube boilers built by SA Chantiers et Ateliers de la Gironde. The ship could carry 60 tons of coal.

As built, the ship carried one Canon de 65 mm Modèle 1891 naval gun, six QF 3-pounder Hotchkiss guns and two 450 mm torpedo tubes.

Construction and purchase
At the turn of the 20th century, during a program to strengthen the Ottoman Navy, large quantities of cannons, ammunition and supplies were ordered from Krupp in 1904. In order to maintain diplomatic and financial balance, the Ottoman government decided to place subsequent orders with France. For this purpose, four Sultanhisar-class torpedo boats were ordered from Schneider-Creusot to meet the needs of the navy. As this small order was not sufficient for the French, the 200-ton s and the 420-ton Marmaris were also ordered. During negotiations in 1906, the French convinced the Ottoman government to purchase four more destroyers, which were ordered on 22 January 1906. Based on the French Durandal-class destroyers, Samsun, Yarhisar and Basra were built by Ateliers de la Gironde, while Taşoz was built by Schneider et Cie.

Operational history
Having joined the Ottoman navy in 1907, Samsun took part in training in May 1909 as part of the reforming program of Admiral Douglas Gamble, commander of the British naval mission in Istanbul. The torpedo boats , Mosul, Kütahya, Hamidiye, Demirhisar and Sivrihisar sailed from Sivriada and joined the fleet, practicing torpedo attacks against larger ships. Although the exercise was not in realistic combat conditions, it was the first naval exercise of the Ottoman Navy in twenty years. At the end of the exercise, all ships passed in front of the royal yacht Ertuğrul, which was waiting off Sarayburnu.

Italo-Turkish War and Balkan Wars 
At the beginning of the Italo-Turkish War, on October 1, 1911, Samsun was anchored at Cape Nara with the rest of the Ottoman fleet. The fleet, which had been maneuvering and training since July, had completed its annual visit to Beirut despite increasing political tensions. On October 2, the fleet returned to Istanbul for repairs and maintenance. It did not engage in direct combat with Italian ships throughout the war.

Samsun took part in the Battle of Elli on 16 December 1912. As part of the 2nd Destroyer Division, she, along with the torpedo boat Akhisar, served as a screen, scout and reconnaissance in front of the battleships, but due to the lack of radio equipment, she communicated with the main fleet through the destroyer tender Tirimüjgan using a semaphore. Samsun did not engage in the main battle. Later, the ship was assigned to protect the landing ships with the 2nd Destroyer Division in the Bozcaada landing planned for January 1913, but this operation was later canceled. On 10 January, the 2nd Destroyer Division, along with the main fleet, observed the Greek ships on patrol and pursued them; after shelling from the battleships, the fleet returned to Çanakkale.

World War I 

Samsun served in various missions during World War I. She also took part in the Black Sea raid, which caused the Ottoman Empire to enter the war. Before the raid, the Ottoman fleet gathered off the coast of Kilyos, after which the ships sailed. Yavuz Sultan Selim, Samsun and Taşoz first went to Amasra, where the destroyers took coal from Yavuz Sultan Selim. At 05:00 on October 29, seven miles from Sevastopol, the destroyers began minesweeping, while Yavuz sailed behind the destroyers. Just before 06:30, Yavuz bombarded the harbor of Sevastopol for 15 minutes. However, the Russians were prepared because of a radio message from Odessa at 04:00 hours, announcing the raid by Turkish ships. During this time, Yavuz was exchanging fire with the pre-dreadnought  and shore batteries. Yavuz came within eight kilometers of the shore batteries and shelled them during her evasive maneuvers. Fifteen minutes after the start of the battle, at 06:45, she ceased firing and sailed away. When Yavuz Sultan Selim turned towards the area upon seeing smoke in the southeast direction, she encountered three Russian destroyers and opened fire from a distance of 12 km; the destroyers continued to pursue the Turkish ships, but the Russian attack ended after the lead destroyer was heavily damaged by Yavuz Sultan Selim'''s secondary batteries. Meanwhile, the Russian minelayer , loaded with 700 mines and sailing to Sevastopol, was encountered by Yavuz, which sank the ship with her 15 cm guns. 75 men (72 enlisted and three officers) of the crew of the Prut were rescued by  Samsun and Taşoz. Since the arrival of the Prut was expected, the defensive minefield around the harbor was unresponsive. When it was activated 20 minutes later, the Ottoman ships had left the area. According to the telegram sent from the Naval Command to the Deputy Commander-in-Chief at 22:30 on October 29, according to one of the captured Russian officers taken prisoner from the Prut, the task of the Russian ships was to lay mines in front of the mouth of the Bosphorus at night in order to destroy the Ottoman fleet leaving the Bosphorus. After the battle, the ships returned to Istanbul.

On March 28, 1915, six seaplanes from the Russian fleet, which had come within 25 miles of the Bosphorus, bombed Anadolufeneri and Rumelifeneri and the coastal fortifications and batteries in the area. The following day, another Russian force struck transport ships in Zonguldak and Ereğli. In response, the Ottoman ships put to sea on April 1. At 06.30 on April 3, 15 miles off Odessa, Mecidiye struck a mine and sank. after this loss, the fleet turned back; Samsun and Taşoz were on course for an intercepting mission in case the Russians came to the area, but for technical reasons they could not maintain their speed and turned back to Istanbul.Samsun also performed convoy escort and anti-submarine duties throughout the war. Waiting for Samsun to move about 10 miles away from the transports, the submarine launched a torpedo which hit Tecilli; the ship sank with 18 crew members. E11 also attacked Başlangıç but its torpedo missed, the crew of Başlangıç left it stranded. After artillery fire from the shore, E11 moved away from the area. On June 17, Samsun and Yarhisar spotted and attacked the submarine  near the Bosphorus, but she managed to escape by diving. On August 4, E14 once again encountered Samsun near Tekirdağ, escorting the ships Tenedos and Bandirma. The torpedo launched by the submarine passed under the Tenedos and missed.

The French submarine  had entered the Marmara Sea by secretly passing through the Dardanelles on October 20. Due to malfunctions, the submarine was detected trying to exit on October 30 and was damaged by shore batteries; it was abandoned by its crew, the submarine ran aground in water four meters deep. On November 2, the submarine was easily refloated and on November 3, it was decided to be towed to Istanbul by the minelayer . Aydın Reis from Çanakkale, Nusret and the submarine met Samsun off Marmara Island at 18:00. Under the leadership of Samsun, which took over the escort duty, the ships, which were on blackout against Allied submarines, collided during the course change. Samsun, whose bow was damaged, was towed by the tug Paris in the last part of its voyage and returned to Marmara Island. Nusret, which was slightly damaged, reached the island with its own engine power, while the French submarine, which survived the tow rope, was taken to the island by starting its engines. In July 1916, she was tasked with clearing the Russian mines laid at the entrance to the Bosphorus. Mounted with minesweeping equipment brought from Germany, the ship, together with the Antalya and Demirhisar-class ships, managed to clear a channel to enter the Bosphorus after weeks of effort.Samsun, together with her sister ship , took part in the Battle of Imbros, which took place on January 20, 1918. The destroyers sailed to Çanakkale in secrecy after replenishing coal in Zonguldak. The Çanakkale Fortified Position Command gathered intelligence through reconnaissance flights over Imbros and Limni, and the fighter planes requested from the German station in Xanthi were assigned the task of protecting Yavuz Sultan Selim and Midilli, and surveilling the Bulgarian coast. On January 19, 1918, the operational order was issued for Yavuz Sultan Selim to target large enemy ships, Midilli to target light ships and the airbase at Imbros, and destroyers, including Samsun, to provide security against submarines in front of the Bosphorus. Midilli and Yavuz Sultan Selim struck mines during the operation; Midilli sank while the damaged Yavuz Sultan Selim ran aground at Cape Nara. During the week-long rescue operations, Samsun, together with some gunboats, provided security against submarines.

Russia withdrew from the war in December 1917 and an armistice was declared. Samsun performed escort duties in the Black Sea in 1918. On March 1, the ships Samsun and Hamidiye, Numune-i Hamiyet and Muavenet-i Milliye escorted the Akdeniz carrying 300 infantry to Trabzon, which the Russians had returned. On March 30, Samsun, Basra and Taşoz and the ship Patmos went to Odessa to observe the armistice with the Russian navy. On June 28, Yavuz Sultan Selim, Samsun, Numune-i Hamiyet and Muavenet-i Milliye, which went to check the Russian navy intercepted in Novorossiysk, arrived at the port and saw that the Russians had scuttled their own ships. While "Samsun" and other destroyers remained in the area, Yavuz Sultan Selim returned to Istanbul. After the Armistice of Mudros signed on October 30, 1918, she was interned.

 Republican period Samsun'' was out of service during the proclamation of the republic. She was recommissioned into the Turkish Navy in 1924 and was removed from the navy inventory in 1932. In 1949 she was dismantled at Gölcük.

Notes

Footnotes

References
 
 
 
 
 
 
 

World War I naval ships of the Ottoman Empire
1907 ships